William Simpson may refer to:

Politicians
William T. Simpson (1886–1980), New York politician
William Dunlap Simpson (1823–1890), Governor of South Carolina from 1879
William John Simpson (1851–1901), journalist and political figure in Quebec

Others
 William Simpson (teacher), first headmaster (1823–1828) of Bootham School
William Simpson (artist) (1823–1899), Scottish war artist and correspondent
William Simpson (portrait artist) (1818–1872), an African American artist and civil right activist in the 19th century
William Simpson (judge) (1894–1966), Australian Supreme Court judge
William Simpson (rugby league), rugby league footballer of the 1900s and 1910s
William Simpson (trade unionist) (1920–2001), Scottish trade unionist and political activist
W. Douglas Simpson (William Douglas Simpson, 1896–1968), Scottish architecture and archaeology academic and writer
William Gayley Simpson (1892–1991), American racial activist and author
William Henry Simpson (c. 1840–1873), South Australian jockey
William Hood Simpson (1888–1980), US general who commanded the US Ninth Army in Europe in World War II
William James Simpson (born 1954), Australian academic
William John Ritchie Simpson (1855–1931), Scottish physician and specialist in tropical medicine
William Kelly Simpson (1928–2017), American professor emeritus of Egyptology and archaeology
William R. Simpson (born 1966), Alaskan chemist

See also
Will Simpson (disambiguation)
Bill Simpson (disambiguation)